The women's doubles tournament at the 1970 French Open was held from 25 May to 7 June 1970 on the outdoor clay courts at the Stade Roland Garros in Paris, France. The fourth-seeded team of Gail Chanfreau and Françoise Dürr won the title, defeating the first-seeded pair of Rosie Casals and Billie Jean King in the final in three sets.

Seeds

Draw

Finals

Top half

Section 1

Section 2

Bottom half

Section 3

Section 4

References

External links
 Main draw
1970 French Open – Women's draws and results at the International Tennis Federation

Women's Doubles
French Open by year – Women's doubles
1970 in women's tennis
1970 in French women's sport